Oliver George Wallace (August 6, 1887 – September 15, 1963) was an English composer and conductor. He was especially known for his film music compositions, which were written for many animation, documentary, and feature films from Walt Disney Studios.

Biography
Wallace was born on August 6, 1887, in London. After completing his musical training, he went to the United States in 1904, becoming a US citizen ten years later. He initially worked primarily on the West Coast in Seattle as a conductor of theater orchestras and as an organist accompanying silent films. At the same time, he also made a name as a songwriter, writing tunes such as the popular "Hindustan". With the advent of the talking film era, he worked increasingly for Hollywood film studios in the 1930s.

In 1936 he joined Disney Studios and quickly became one of the most important composers in the studio for animated short films. Wallace provided the music for 139 of these shorts. One of his best-known pieces is the song "Der Fuehrer's Face" from the 1942 Donald Duck propaganda cartoon, though he was uncredited. This parody of a Horst Wessel song was, mainly through the version by Spike Jones and His City Slickers, one of the biggest hits during the Second World War. Other shorts Wallace scored include Ben and Me (1953), about Benjamin Franklin and a mouse, and the Oscar-winning Toot, Whistle, Plunk and Boom (1953), the first cartoon to use the new CinemaScope process.

Walt Disney also had Wallace score full-length films for the studios for over 27 years. He started writing the score for Dumbo (1941), for which he, together with Frank Churchill, won his first and only Oscar in 1942. He went on to score Victory Through Air Power (1943), The Adventures of Ichabod and Mr. Toad (1949), Cinderella (1950) along with Paul J. Smith, Alice in Wonderland (1951), Peter Pan (1953), Lady and the Tramp (1955), and White Wilderness (1958). Wallace also appeared in live action reference footage for Snow White and the Seven Dwarfs for two of the seven dwarfs Dopey and Sneezy dancing while stacked on top of each other and did the whistling for Ichabod Crane as he’s riding home on his horse. He received four other Oscar nominations for the music to Victory Through Air Power with Edward H. Plumb and Paul J. Smith (losing to Alfred Newman for The Song of Bernadette), Cinderella with Paul J. Smith (losing to Adolph Deutsch and Roger Edens for Annie Get Your Gun),  Alice in Wonderland (losing to Johnny Green and Saul Chaplin for An American in Paris), and White Wilderness (losing to Dimitri Tiomkin for The Old Man and the Sea). A common characteristic of all these productions was the cooperation of several composers in the creation of the music. Wallace understood this and integrated leitmotiv-like elements from the individual songs into the film scores.

When the Disney studios began to increasingly produce full-length feature films, Wallace also wrote scores for these. In Darby O'Gill and the Little People (1959), Wallace wrote not only the score but also set the Lawrence Edward Watkin-penned popular songs "Pretty Irish Girl" and "The Wishing Song". In Toby Tyler, or Ten Weeks with a Circus (1959), he appeared as an actor, playing the conductor of the circus band.

Starting with Seal Island (1948), Wallace also specialized in musical accompaniments for Disney documentaries, including nearly all the films for the "People and Places" series and some of the True-Life Adventures. The music of White Wilderness (1958) was even nominated for an Oscar in 1959, a rare feat for a documentary film.

Overall, Wallace contributed music to almost over 150 Walt Disney productions. He worked for Disney studios for 27 years. He remained active in the studio in Los Angeles until shortly before his death at a Burbank, California hospital on September 15, 1963, at the age of 76. In 2008, he was posthumously honored with a Disney Legends award.

Filmography

Most of the films were scored in collaboration with other composers.

Film scores
 1934 – Girl in the Case – Music
 1941 – Dumbo – Score and some songs
 1942 - Saludos Amigos - Score
 1943 – Victory Through Air Power – Score
 1944 - The Three Caballeros - Score 
 1946 – Make Mine Music – Score (The Martins and the Coys)
 1947 – Fun and Fancy Free – Score (Bongo), (Mickey and the Beanstalk)
 1948 – Seal Island – Score
 1949 – The Adventures of Ichabod and Mr. Toad – Score
 1950 – Cinderella – Score (participation)
 1951 – Alice in Wonderland – Score
 1953 – Peter Pan – Score and some songs
 1954 – Siam – Score
 1955 – Men Against the Arctic  – Score
 1955 – Lady and the Tramp  – Score (participation)
 1957 – Old Yeller – Score and song
 1958 – White Wilderness – Score
 1958 – Tonka – Score
 1959 – Darby O'Gill and the Little People – Score and song
 1960 – Jungle Cat – Score
 1960 – Ten Who Dared – Score
 1961 – Nikki, Wild Dog of the North – Score
 1962 – Big Red – Score
 1962 – The Legend of Lobo – Score
 1963 – Savage Sam – Score
 1963 – The Incredible Journey – Score 
 1995 – Operation Dumbo Drop – Song (posthumous)

Animated Shorts

 1937 - Mickey's Amateurs - Score
 1937 - Modern Inventions - Score
 1937 - Clock Cleaners - Score
 1938 - Donald's Ostrich - Score
 1938 - Self Control - Score
 1938 - Boat Builders - Score
 1938 - Donald's Better Self - Score
 1938 - Donald's Nephews - Score
 1938 - Mickey's Trailer - Score
 1938 - Good Scouts - Score
 1939 - Donald's Lucky Day - Score
 1939 - Society Dog Show - Score
 1939 - Mickey's Surprise Party - Score
 1939 - Donald's Cousin Gus - Score
 1939 - Sea Scouts - Score
 1939 - Donald's Penguin - Score
 1939 - The Autograph Hound - Score
 1940 - The Riveter - Score
 1940 - Tugboat Mickey - Score
 1940 - Donald's Vacation - Score
 1940 - Window Cleaners - Score
 1940 - Mr. Mouse Takes a Trip - Score
 1940 - Pantry Pirate - Score
 1941 - Timber - Score
 1941 - The Little Whirlwind - Score
 1941 - Early to Bed - Score
 1942 - Donald's Decision - Score
 1942 - The New Spirit - Score
 1942 - Symphony Hour - Score
 1942 - Donald's Snow Fight - Score
 1942 - Donald's Garden - Score
 1942 - Donald's Gold Mine - Score
 1942 - T-Bone for Two - Score
 1942 - The Vanishing Private - Score
 1942 - Pluto at the Zoo - Score
 1942 - Bellboy Donald - Score
 1943 – Der Fuehrer's Face – Score and title song
 1943 - Education for Death - Score
 1943 - Donald's Tire Trouble - Score
 1943 - Pluto and the Armadillo - Score
 1943 - Private Pluto - Score
 1943 - Victory Vehicles - Score
 1943 - Chicken Little - Score
 1944 - Donald Duck and the Gorilla - Score
 1944 - Contrary Condor - Score
 1944 - Commando Duck - Score 
 1944 - How to Play Football - Score
 1944 - Springtime for Pluto - Score
 1944 - The Plastics Inventor - Score
 1944 - First Aiders - Score
 1944 - The Clock Watcher - Score
 1945 - Dog Watch - Score
 1945 - African Diary - Score
 1945 - Canine Casanova - Score
 1945 - Duck Pimples - Score
 1945 - The Legend of Coyote Rock - Score
 1945 - No Sail - Score
 1945 - Cured Duck - Score
 1945 - Canine Patrol - Score
 1945 - Old Sequoia - Score
 1946 - A Knight For a Day - Score
 1946 - Pluto's Kid Brother - Score
 1946 - In Dutch - Score
 1946 - Squatter's Rights - Score
 1946 - Donald's Double Trouble - Score
 1946 - The Purloined Pup - Score
 1946 - Wet Paint - Score
 1946 - Dumb Bell of the Yukon - Score
 1946 - Lighthouse Keeping - Score
 1946 - Bath Day - Score
 1946 - Frank Duck Brings 'Em Back Alive - Score
 1946 - Double Dribble - Score
 1947 - Pluto's Housewarming - Score
 1947 - Rescue Dog - Score
 1947 - Straight Shooters - Score
 1947 - Sleepy Time Donald - Score
 1947 - Figaro and Frankie - Score
 1947 - Clown of the Jungle - Score
 1947 - Donald's Dilemma - Score
 1947 - Crazy with the Heat - Score
 1947 - Bootle Beetle - Score
 1947 - Wide Open Spaces - Score
 1947 - Mickey's Delayed Date - Score
 1947 - Foul Hunting - Score
 1947 - Chip an' Dale - Score 
 1947 - Mail Dog - Score
 1947 - Pluto's Blue Note- Score
 1948 - They're Off - Score
 1948 - The Big Wash - Score
 1948 - Drip Dippy Donald - Score
 1948 - Mickey Down Under - Score
 1948 - Daddy Duck - Score
 1948 - Bone Bandit - Score
 1948 - Donald's Dream Voice - Score
 1948 - Pluto's Purchase - Score
 1948 - The Trial of Donald Duck - Score
 1948 - Cat Nap Pluto - Score
 1948 - Inferior Decorator - Score
 1948 - Pluto's Fledgling - Score
 1948 - Soup's On - Score
 1948 - Three for Breakfast - Score
 1948 - Mickey and the Seal - Score
 1948 - Tea for Two Hundred - Score
 1949 - Pueblo Pluto - Score
 1949 - Donald's Happy Birthday - Score
 1949 - Pluto's Surprise Package - Score
 1949 - Sea Salts - Score
 1949 - Pluto's Sweater - Score
 1949 - Winter Storage - Score
 1949 - Bubble Bee - Score
 1949 - Honey Harvester - Score
 1949 - Tennis Racquet - Score
 1949 - All in a Nutshell - Score
 1949 - Goofy Gymnastics - Score
 1949 - The Greener Yard - Score
 1949 - Sheep Dog - Score
 1949 - Slide Donald Slide - Score 
 1950 - Pluto's Heart Throb - Score
 1950 - Lion Around - Score
 1950 - Pluto and the Gopher - Score
 1950 - Crazy Over Daisy - Score
 1950 - Wonder Dog - Score
 1950 - Primitive Pluto - Score
 1950 - Morris the Midget Moose - Score
 1951 - Corn Chips - Score
 1951 - Bee on Guard - Score
 1952 - Teachers Are People - Score
 1952 - Let's Stick Together - Score
 1952 - Pluto's Party - Score
 1952 - Two Weeks Vacation - Score
 1953 - Rugged Bear - Score
 1953 – Ben and Me – Score
 1953 - Working for Peanuts - Score
 1953 - Canvas Back Duck - Score
 1954 - Spare the Rod - Score
 1954 - The Lone Chipmunks - Score
 1954 - Pigs Is Pigs - Score
 1954 - Casey Bats Again - Score
 1954 - Dragon Around - Score
 1954 - Grin and Bear it - Score
 1954 - Social Lion - Score
 1954 - The Flying Squirrel - Score
 1954 - Grand Canyonscope - Score
 1955 - No Hunting - Score
 1955 - Bearly Asleep - Score
 1955 - Beezy Bear - Score
 1955 - Up A Tree - Score
 1956 - Chips Ahoy - Score
 1956 - Hooked Bear - Score
 1959 - How to Have an Accident at Work - Score

Actor
 1937 - Snow White and the Seven Dwarfs - (live action model for animators to use as a guide) (Dopey and Sneezy stacked on top of each other during the Silly Song sequence)
 1949 – The Adventures of Ichabod and Mr. Toad – Winkie, Ichabod Crane's whistling (voice)
 1960 – Toby Tyler, or Ten Weeks with a Circus (1960) – Bandleader (voice)

References

External links
 

1887 births
1963 deaths
20th-century American composers
20th-century American male musicians
20th-century English composers
American film score composers
American male film score composers
American television composers
Animated film score composers
Best Original Music Score Academy Award winners
English emigrants to the United States
English film score composers
English male film score composers
English television composers
Musicians from London
Theatre organists
Walt Disney Animation Studios people